John Hajek is an Australian linguist and professor at the University of Melbourne.

Hajek has held research fellowships in the United Kingdom and Australia. He is currently director of RUMACCC (Research Unit for Multilingualism and Cross-cultural Communication) and a past president of LCNAU (Languages and Cultures Network for Australian Universities).

See also
Kenaboi language

External links
 http://www.languages.unimelb.edu.au/about/staff/profiles/hajek.html

Living people
Linguists from Australia
Year of birth missing (living people)